Novokhvalynsky (Yañı Xvalın) is a rural locality (a khutor) in Yuldybayevsky Selsoviet, Kugarchinsky District, Bashkortostan, Russia. The population was 317 as of 2010. There are 4 streets.

Geography 
Novokhvalynsky is located 14 km southeast of Mrakovo (the district's administrative centre) by road. Yuldybay is the nearest rural locality.

References 

Rural localities in Kugarchinsky District